An annular solar eclipse occurred at the Moon's descending node of the orbit on February 4–5, 1981. A solar eclipse occurs when the Moon passes between Earth and the Sun, thereby totally or partly obscuring the image of the Sun for a viewer on Earth. An annular solar eclipse occurs when the Moon's apparent diameter is smaller than the Sun's, blocking most of the Sun's light and causing the Sun to look like an annulus (ring). An annular eclipse appears as a partial eclipse over a region of the Earth thousands of kilometres wide. This annular solar eclipse was large because the Moon covered 99.4% of the Sun, with a path width of only 25 km (15.534 mi, or 82,080.997 feet).
It was visible in Australia, crossing over Tasmania and southern Stewart Island of New Zealand near sunrise on February 5 (Thursday), and ended at sunset over western South America on February 4 (Wednesday). Occurring only 4 days before perigee (Perigee on February 8, 1981), the moon's apparent diameter was larger.

The moon's apparent diameter was 7 arcseconds smaller than the July 31, 1981 total solar eclipse.

More details about the Annular Solar Eclipse of 1981 Feb 04. 
Eclipse Magnitude = 0.99375 (99.375%)
Eclipse Obscuration = 0.98754 (98.754%)
Greatest Eclipse = 1981 Feb 04 at 22:09:23.5 TD (22:08:32.1 UTC)	
Ecliptic Conjunction = 1981 Feb 04 at 22:14:36.9 TD (22:13:45.5 UTC)
Equatorial Conjunction 1981 Feb 04 at 21:58:30.2 TD (21:57:38.8 UTC)
Gamma = -0.48375 (48.511%)
Sun's Right Ascension = 21.232
Sun's Declination = -16.03º
Sun's Diameter = 1946.4 arcseconds
Moon's Right Ascension = 21.239
Moon's Declination = -16.49º
Moon's Diameter = 1907.2 arcseconds
Moon's Distance = 375948.60 km (233603.63 mi)

Related eclipses

Eclipses in 1981 
 A penumbral lunar eclipse on Tuesday, 20 January 1981.
 An annular solar eclipse on Wednesday, 4 February 1981.
 A partial lunar eclipse on Friday, 17 July 1981.
 A total solar eclipse on Friday, 31 July 1981.

Solar eclipses of 1979–1982

Saros 140 

It is a part of Saros cycle 140, repeating every 18 years, 11 days, containing 71 events. The series started with partial solar eclipse on April 16, 1512. It contains total eclipses from July 21, 1656, through November 9, 1836, hybrid eclipses from November 20, 1854, through December 23, 1908, and annular eclipses from January 3, 1927, through December 7, 2485. The series ends at member 71 as a partial eclipse on June 1, 2774. The longest duration of totality was 4 minutes, 10 seconds on August 12, 1692.

Tritos series

Metonic series

Notes

References

 Annular Solar Eclipse Observed for Solar Radius Determination Observed from Tasmania, by Fiala, A. D., Herald, D., & Dunham, D. W, Bulletin of the American Astronomical Society, Vol. 13, p. 552
 Correcting predictions of solar eclipse contact times for the effects of lunar limb irregularities Observations from Tasmania by Herald, D. Journal of the British Astronomical Association, vol.93, no.6, p. 241–246

1981 2 4
1981 in science
1981 2 4
February 1981 events